McGaw is a ghost town in the municipality of Ashfield–Colborne–Wawanosh in Huron County, south of Carlow, Ontario, Canada.

A small railway town on the outskirts of Goderich, McGaw sat on the now-defunct Guelph and Goderich Railway; the last train was in December 1988. In McGaw, there used to be a station and a siding. The station was torn down in the 1960s; cattle pens were still operating but closed before the line was abandoned.

Communities in Huron County, Ontario
Ghost towns in Ontario
Railway towns in Ontario